Akala  is a village in Bhulath Tehsil in Kapurthala district of Punjab State, India. The village is administrated by a Sarpanch who is an elected representative of village as per the constitution of India and Panchayati raj (India).

Transport 
There are no railway stations near to Akala in less than 10 km; however, Jalandhar City Railway station is 29 km away from the village. The village is 76 km away from Sri Guru Ram Dass Jee International Airport in Amritsar and the next nearest airport is Pathankot Airport in Pathankot, which is located 82 km away from the village. Kartarpur, Urmar Tanda, Kapurthala, Jalandhar are the nearby cities to Akala village.

Nearby villages
 Bagrian
 Bajaj
 Bhagwanpur
 Boparai
 Fatehpur
 Jhall Bajaj
 Karnail Ganj
 Metlan Khairabad
 Pandori
 Sher Singhwala
 Surak

References

List of cities near the village 
Bhulath
Kapurthala 
Phagwara 
Sultanpur Lodhi

Air travel connectivity 
The closest International airport to the village is Sri Guru Ram Dass Jee International Airport.

External links
 Villages in Kapurthala
 List of Villages in Kapurthala Tehsil

Villages in Kapurthala district